Rebinea brunnea is a species of moth of the family Tortricidae. It is found in Araucanía Region, Chile.

The wingspan is 15 mm. The ground colour of the forewings is brownish grey, strigulated (finely streaked) with dark grey, preserved in the median portion of the costa and along the dorsum. The rest of the forewings is suffused with brown and reddish. The hindwings are greyish, mixed with brownish on the periphery and strigulated with brown grey.

Etymology
The species name refers to colouration of the forewings and is derived from Latin brunnea (meaning brown).

References

Moths described in 2010
Euliini
Moths of South America
Taxa named by Józef Razowski
Endemic fauna of Chile